Anita Brookner  (16 July 1928 – 10 March 2016) was an English novelist and art historian. She was Slade Professor of Fine Art at the University of Cambridge from 1967 to 1968 and was the first woman to hold this visiting professorship. She was awarded the 1984 Booker–McConnell Prize for her novel Hotel du Lac.

Life and education
Brookner (Bruckner) was born in Herne Hill, a suburb of London. She was the only child of Newson Bruckner, a Jewish immigrant from Piotrków Trybunalski in Poland, and Maude Schiska, a singer whose grandfather had emigrated from Warsaw, Poland, and founded a tobacco factory at which her husband worked after arriving in Britain aged 18. Her mother gave up her singing career when she married and, according to her daughter, was unhappy for the rest of her life. Maude changed the family's surname to Brookner because of anti-German sentiment in Britain. Anita Brookner had a lonely childhood, although her grandmother and uncle lived with the family, and her parents, secular Jews, opened their house to Jewish refugees fleeing the Germans during the 1930s and World War II. "I have said that I am one of the loneliest women in London" she said in her Paris Review interview.

She was educated at the James Allen's Girls' School, a fee-paying school. In 1949 she received a BA in history from King's College London, and in 1953 a doctorate in art history from the Courtauld Institute of Art, University of London. Under the supervision of Anthony Blunt, then director of the Courtauld, what was originally a Masters thesis on the French genre painter Jean-Baptiste Greuze was upgraded to a doctorate. However, she received a French government scholarship in 1950 to the  École du Louvre and spent most of the decade living in Paris.

Career

Academic
In 1967, she became the first woman to hold the Slade Professorship of Fine Art at Cambridge University. She was a visiting lecturer at Reading University from 1959 to 1964 when she became a lecturer at the Courtauld Institute of Art. She was promoted to Reader at the Courtauld in 1977, where she worked until her retirement in 1988. She began her career as a specialist on 18th century French art but later extended her expertise to the romantics. She  contributed articles to ArtReview in the late 1950s and early 1960s,

Among her students at the Courtauld was art historian Olivier Berggruen, whose graduate work she advised. She was a Fellow of King's College London and of New Hall, Cambridge (Murray Edwards College from 2008).

Photographs taken by Anita Brookner are held in the Conway Library of art and architecture at the Courtauld Institute.

Novelist
Brookner published her first novel, A Start in Life (1981), at the age of 53. Thereafter she published roughly one a year. Brookner was regarded as a stylist. Her novels explore themes of emotional loss and difficulties associated with fitting into society, and intellectual, middle-class women, who suffer isolation and disappointments in love. Many of her characters are the children of European immigrants to Britain; a number appear to be of Jewish descent. Hotel du Lac (1984), her fourth novel, was awarded the Booker–McConnell Prize.

Private life and honours
Brookner never married, but took care of her parents as they aged. Brookner commented in one interview that she had received several proposals of marriage, but rejected all of them, concluding that men were "people with their own agenda, who think you might be fitted in if they lop off certain parts. You can see them coming a mile off."

She gave the 1974 Aspects of Art Lecture.  In 1990, she was appointed a Commander of the Order of the British Empire (CBE).

She died in the Royal Borough of Kensington and Chelsea, London, on 10 March 2016, at the age of 87.

Publications
Greuze: 1725–1805: The Rise and Fall of an Eighteenth-century Phenomenon (1972)  (on Jean-Baptiste Greuze)
Jacques-Louis David (1980)  (on the history painter Jacques-Louis David)
A Start in Life (1981, US title The Debut) 
Providence (1982) 
Look at Me (1983) 
Hotel du Lac (1984)  (Booker Prize winner)
Family and Friends (1985) 
A Misalliance (1986) 
A Friend from England (1987) 
Latecomers (1988) 
Lewis Percy (1989) 
Brief Lives (1990) 
A Closed Eye (1991) 
Fraud (1992) 
A Family Romance (1993, US title Dolly) 
A Private View (1994) 
Incidents in the Rue Laugier (1995) 
Altered States (1996) 
Visitors (1997) 
Falling Slowly (1998) 
Undue Influence (1999) 
Romanticism and its Discontents (2000) 
The Bay of Angels (2001)  
The Next Big Thing (2002, US title Making Things Better) (longlisted for the Booker Prize)
The Rules of Engagement (2003) 
Leaving Home (2005) 
Strangers (2009) (shortlisted for James Tait Black Memorial Prize)  
At The Hairdresser (2011) (novella, available only as an e-book)

See also
Women in the art history field

References

Further reading

External links

Anita Brookner Collection at the Harry Ransom Center at the University of Texas at Austin

1928 births
2016 deaths
People from Herne Hill
People educated at James Allen's Girls' School
20th-century English novelists
20th-century English women writers
21st-century English novelists
21st-century English women writers
Academics of the Courtauld Institute of Art
Alumni of the Courtauld Institute of Art
Alumni of King's College London
École du Louvre alumni
English art historians
English Jewish writers
English people of Polish-Jewish descent
English women novelists
Commanders of the Order of the British Empire
Fellows of King's College London
Fellows of Murray Edwards College, Cambridge
Fellows of the Royal Society of Literature
Jewish novelists
Booker Prize winners
Women art historians
English women non-fiction writers
British women historians